The Royal Danish Playhouse is a theatre building for the Royal Danish Theatre, situated on the harbour front in the Frederiksstaden neighbourhood of central Copenhagen, Denmark. It was created as a purpose-built venue for dramatic theatre, supplementing the theatre's old venue from 1874 on Kongens Nytorv and the 2004 Copenhagen Opera House, which are used for ballet and opera.

The Royal Playhouse is designed by the Danish architectural practice Lundgaard & Tranberg and received a RIBA European Award in 2008 for its architecture as well as a Red dot design award for the design of the chairs.

History
Since the 1880s Copenhagen city started the discussion of building a new Royal Playhouse for the latest trend in acting, where focus was on the more natural and intimate drama speaking works as opposed to the popular recital theater of the time.

Building
The theatre is designed by the Danish architectural practice Lundgaard & Tranberg. It is built in a long, slim, deep-brown brick that was specially developed for the project. The exterior is dominated by a continuous glass-encased top story with offices and back-stage facilities for the actors. Above the glass band is the dark copper-clad cube of the stage tower.

The glazed foyer facing the water runs along the entire length of the building. It affords panoramic views of the harbour and contains a restaurant and a cafë.

With about 40 per cent of the building projecting over the water, the waterfront promenade pivots around the playhouse, diverting pedestrians onto a raised 150 metre long walkway layered with rustic oak planks placed on Venetian-style crooked columns creating a floating feel.

See also
 Architecture of Denmark

References

External links
 .

Theatres completed in 2008
Theatres in Copenhagen
Tourist attractions in Copenhagen
National theatres